Ernest Gadsby (21 June 1884 – 1963), sometimes known as Scan Gadsby, was an English professional footballer who played as a forward in the Football League for Barnsley, Glossop, Chesterfield and Bristol City.

Personal life 
Gadsby's brother Walter was also a footballer. In January 1918, three-and-a-half years after the outbreak of the First World War, Gadsby was called up to serve as a gunner in the Royal Field Artillery. He was posted to the Western Front in April 1918 and was gassed and suffered trench fever.

Career statistics

References

1884 births
1963 deaths
Footballers from Derbyshire
English footballers
English Football League players
Association football inside forwards
Association football forwards
Chesterfield F.C. players
Denaby United F.C. players
Mexborough Town F.C. players
Barnsley F.C. players
Bristol City F.C. players
Castleford Town F.C. players
Reading F.C. players
Worksop Town F.C. players
Glossop North End A.F.C. players
Bentley Colliery F.C. players
British Army personnel of World War I
Royal Field Artillery soldiers
FA Cup Final players